Dragon Ball Z: Dead Zone, originally released theatrically in Japan as simply Dragon Ball Z and later as  for its Japanese VHS and Laserdisc release, is a 1989 Japanese anime fantasy martial arts film, the fourth installment in the Dragon Ball film series, and the first under the Dragon Ball Z moniker. It was originally released in Japan on July 15 at the "Toei Manga Matsuri" film festival along with the 1989 film version of Himitsu no Akko-chan, the first Akuma-kun film, and the film version of Kidou Keiji Jiban.

Despite continuity inconsistencies, Dead Zone acts as a prelude to the Dragon Ball Z television series and is the only film to get a follow-up within the series, that being the Garlic Jr. arc which takes place between the main Frieza and Android arcs. The canonicity of this arc is debated as it does not appear in the original manga.

Plot

Following his defeat by Goku at the 23rd World Martial Arts Tournament, Piccolo trains alone when he is caught in an ambush by a group of mysterious warriors. Chi-Chi, along with her father and son, Gohan, are attacked by the same group while Goku is away fishing. He senses the danger his family faces and returns to find that his son has been abducted.

The impish Garlic Jr. is responsible for the attack so that he could retrieve the four-star Dragon Ball that was attached to Gohan's hat. Garlic Jr. senses an immense power within Gohan, and decides to make him his pupil rather than kill him. After gathering the remaining six magical Dragon Balls, Garlic Jr. summons the eternal dragon Shenron and he wishes for immortality. Goku prepares to rescue his son when Kami, Earth's guardian, arrives and explains that centuries prior, he and Garlic Jr.'s father, Garlic, competed for the position of Guardian of the Earth and Kami was victorious. In revenge, Garlic unleashed a demonic horde onto the Earth until Kami defeated him and ended the invasion. Goku proceeds to search for Gohan when he is attacked by the villain's henchmen while Kami faces Garlic Jr.

Krillin and Piccolo arrive with the latter defeating henchman Sansho while Goku manages to defeat the other two henchmen, Ginger and Nicky. Meanwhile, Kami is bested by Garlic Jr. until Goku and Piccolo rescue him. With Garlic Jr.'s newly obtained immortality and a new, muscular form, the rivals Goku and Piccolo are forced to work together and are able to eventually defeat him. Still possessing disdain for one another and mistakenly believing Garlic Jr. to be dead, Goku and Piccolo prepare to fight when Garlic Jr. opens up a portal into another dimension; a void of darkness known as the Dead Zone. Gohan becomes enraged as he witnesses his father and friends in danger and releases his latent power, hurdling Garlic Jr. into his own vortex to be trapped for all eternity. Unable to recall the events, Gohan believes that his father defeated Garlic Jr. while Goku realizes his son has amazing hidden potential. Piccolo vows to defeat Goku while watching him and his friends depart.

Cast

Toshio Furukawa's voice from the original Japanese version is retained in the AB Groupe dub at the beginning of this film, when Piccolo screams and destroys a large rock formation.

In Funimation's English credits, Christopher R. Sabat is miscredited as playing the Ox King, a mistake carried over to the 2006 dub of The World's Strongest.

Music
OP (Opening Theme):
 "Cha-La Head-Cha-La"
 Lyrics by Yukinojō Mori
 Music by Chiho Kiyooka
 Arranged by Kenji Yamamoto
 Performed by Hironobu Kageyama
IN (Insert Song):
 
 Lyrics by Sakiko Iwamuro
 Music by 
 Arranged by Kenji Yamamoto
 Performed by Masako Nozawa
ED (Ending Theme):
 
 Lyrics by Naruhisa Arakawa
 Music by 
 Arranged by Kenji Yamamoto
 Performed by Manna

English dub soundtracks
The 1997 Pioneer release kept the original Japanese music.

There is a discrepancy that states the 2005 English dub score was composed by Mark Menza, which it was not. It was composed by Nathan Johnson. The Double Feature release contains an alternate audio track containing the English dub with original Japanese background music by Shunsuke Kikuchi and an ending theme of "Come Out, Incredible Zenkai Power!".

Box office

International releases

North America
The film was licensed in North America by Funimation and the home video rights were sub-licensed to Pioneer Entertainment. Pioneer was released on VHS, LaserDisc, and DVD on December 17, 1997. They used the same voice cast as the TV series did at the time, and was dubbed by Ocean Productions. They released the film as Dead Zone. As a feature on the Pioneer DVD, deleted scenes from the original episodes 1 and 9 are shown in Japanese with English subtitles, as these two episodes were yet to be dubbed in full at the time. Since then, Funimation released the film of the Rock the Dragon Edition set with Ocean dub on DVD on August 13, 2013, it has 53 edited episodes of the TV series, plus two edited films of The World's Strongest and The Tree of Might as they aired on Toonami.

Once their sub-license expired, Funimation released the film to DVD in "Ultimate Uncut Edition" on May 31, 2005, with completely new dub done by Funimation's voice cast and an feature film commentary. There's also re-released the film on November 14, 2006 as part of a film set subtitled "First Strike", also containing The World's Strongest (1990) and The Tree of Might (1990). It was later released in Double Feature set along with The World's Strongest (1990) for Blu-ray and DVD on May 27, 2008, both feature full 1080p format in HD remastered 16:9 aspect ratio and an enhanced 5.1 surround mix. The film was re-released to DVD in remastered thinpak collection on November 1, 2011, containing the first 5 Dragon Ball Z films.

Europe and Malaysia 
AB Groupe, a French company that holds the license to the Dragon Ball franchise in most of Europe, licensed and dubbed the film, which they re-titled In Pursuit of Garlic. This dub featured a voice cast that was unknown for years, but it is now believed that English-speaking voice actors in France were involved with this dub. In Pursuit of Garlic aired on TV in the Netherlands, the United Kingdom, and Ireland, and was sold on DVD in the Netherlands by Bridge Entertainment Group in 2003.

Speedy Video, a Malaysian-based company, released the film on Video CD, here subtitled The Vengeance of the Demon King. Speedy also released the Pioneer English adaptation on VCD. Both the AB Groupe and Speedy dubs are notoriously known for inaccurate translations (e.g. Piccolo was called "Big Green" in the AB Groupe dub) and dialogue that did not fit the mouth flaps.

Critical reception
GameFan magazine reviewed the DVD release in 1998 and gave it a B− rating.

References

External links

 Official anime website of Toei Animation
 
 

1989 films
1989 anime films
Dead Zone
Films about immortality
Films about wish fulfillment
Films directed by Daisuke Nishio
Funimation
Geneon USA
1980s Japanese-language films
Toei Animation films
Films scored by Shunsuke Kikuchi
Japanese animated fantasy films
Japanese fantasy adventure films